Álvaro Ortiz may refer to:
 Álvaro Ortiz (footballer)
 Álvaro Ortiz (golfer)